Prannoy is an Indian masculine given name. Notable people with the name include:

Prannoy Kumar (born 1992), Indian badminton player
Prannoy Roy (born 1949), Indian journalist and media personality

Indian masculine given names